Serpas is a surname. Notable people with the surname include:

Edgardo Antonio Serpas (born 1974), Salvadoran sprinter
Lilian Serpas (1905–1985), Salvadoran poet
Martha Serpas, American poet
Ronal W. Serpas (born c. 1961), American university professor

See also
 Serpa (surname)